The 1977 Colgate Series Championships was a women's tennis tournament played on outdoor hard courts at the Mission Hills Country Club in Palm Springs, California in the United States that was the season-ending tournament of the 1977 Virginia Slims World Championship Series. It was the inaugural edition of the tournament and was held from November 1 through November 6, 1977. The top eight singles players and top four doubles teams, in terms of Colgate Series ranking points, qualified for the event. First-seeded Chris Evert won the singles title and earned $75,000 first-prize money. With a total prize money of $250,000 it was the richest women's tournament to date.

Finals

Singles
 Chris Evert defeated  Billie Jean King 6–2, 6–2
 It was Evert's 11th singles title of the year and the 78th of her career.

Doubles
 Françoise Dürr /  Virginia Wade defeated  Helen Gourlay Cawley /  Joanne Russell 6–1, 4–6, 6–4

Prize money 

Doubles prize money is per team.

See also
 1977 Virginia Slims Championships

References

Virginia Slims of Washington
Colgate Series Championships
Tennis in California
Colgate Series Championships
Colgate Series Championships